Neithrop Fields Cutting is a  geological Site of Special Scientific Interest in Banbury in Oxfordshire. It is a Geological Conservation Review site.

This site exhibits sections dating to the Early Jurassic  around 190 to 180 million years ago. Its Middle Lias sediments show that it was adjacent to the "London landmass", which was then an island. The Upper Lias have a section rich in fossil ammonites. Natural England describes the site as a "key palaeogeographic and stratigraphic locality".

The Banbury Fringe Walk runs through the site.

References

Sites of Special Scientific Interest in Oxfordshire
Geological Conservation Review sites